The grey red-backed vole or the grey-sided vole (Myodes rufocanus) is a species of vole.  An adult grey red-backed vole weighs 20-50 grams.  This species ranges across northern Eurasia, including northern China, the northern Korean Peninsula, and the islands of Sakhalin and Hokkaidō.  It is larger and longer-legged than the northern red-backed vole (Myodes rutilus), which covers a similar range and it is also sympatric with the Norwegian lemming (Lemmus lemmus).

Description
The grey red-backed vole has a reddish-coloured back and grey sides. It can be distinguished from the bank vole by its larger size and distinctive reddish back and from the northern red-backed vole by its larger size, longer legs and relatively longer tail. Unlike some other species of vole in the genus Myodes, the molar teeth of adults are rooted in the jaws.

Distribution and habitat
The grey red-backed vole is native to northern Europe and Asia. Its range extends from Norway, Sweden and Finland eastwards through northern Russia to the Kamchatka Peninsula. It includes the Ural Mountains, the Altai Mountains, northern Korea, Sakhalin Island, Japan, northern Mongolia and China. Its typical habitat is dense undergrowth or rocky areas in coniferous or birch forests, often near rivers, but it is also found in clear cut areas of forests, rough grassland, subarctic shrubby heathland and dry peat bogs.

Biology
The grey red-backed vole feeds on grasses and small herbs, the leaves and shoots of sub-shrubs and berries. It prefers the bilberry (Vaccinium myrtillus) to the northern crowberry (Empetrum nigrum ssp. hermaphroditum) which contains unpalatable phenolic substances.

In tundra regions, this vole exhibits outbreaks when its numbers increase substantially. These occur in a four to five-year population cycle the reasons for which are not fully understood but which may reflect changes in the abundance of certain specialised predators. Lemmings have similar but more violent population explosions. These happen in the same years as vole outbreaks, but occur less frequently. This is partly because lemmings continue to breed during the winter months while populations of grey red-backed voles decline during the winter.

Status
The grey red-backed vole is listed by the IUCN as being of "Least Concern". This is because it is a common species with a very wide range and faces no particular threats. Populations vary cyclically but may be declining somewhat in Fennoscandia, possibly due to changes in forestry practice.

References

Mammals of Asia
Myodes
Mammals described in 1846
Mammals of Japan